Blind Channel is a Finnish nu metal band from Oulu. The band define their musical style as "violent pop". They represented Finland in the Eurovision Song Contest 2021 with the song "Dark Side", finishing in sixth place.

Career 
In February 2021, the band participated in the Finnish national selection for the Eurovision Song Contest 2021 with the modern nu-metal track "Dark Side". They won the selection with 54.3% of the vote (the highest in UMK history) and in May 2021 represented Finland in the contest in Rotterdam, Netherlands, finishing in sixth place with a total of 301 points. Blind Channel received 218 of their total points from televoting, while 83 points were received from juries. The band painted their middle fingers red for their Eurovision performance of "Dark Side", after being informed that they could not lift a middle finger to the audience onstage due to the show's family-friendly nature. On 19 May 2021, a day before their first performance at Eurovision, the band signed to Century Media/Sony Music.

Band members 
 Joel Hokka – vocals
 Niko Moilanen – vocals
 Joonas Porko – guitar
 Olli Matela – bass
 Tommi Lalli – drums
 Aleksi Kaunisvesi – samples, percussion, DJ

Timeline

Discography

Albums

Singles

References

External links 

 
 

2013 establishments in Finland
Eurovision Song Contest entrants for Finland
Eurovision Song Contest entrants of 2021
Finnish alternative rock groups
Musical groups established in 2013
Nu metal musical groups
Post-hardcore groups